Mary of Burgundy (1457–1482) was the first wife of Maximilian I, Holy Roman Emperor.

Mary of Burgundy may also refer to:
 Mary of Burgundy, Duchess of Savoy (1386–1428), wife of Amadeus VIII, Duke of Savoy
 Mary of Burgundy, Duchess of Cleves (1393–1466), wife of Adolph I, Duke of Cleves